Plato Tracy Durham (September 9, 1873 - February 10, 1930) was the first Dean of the Candler School of Theology at Emory University, serving from 1914 to 1918.

Background
Plato Tracy Durham was born on September 9, 1873, in Shelby, North Carolina. He was the son of Captain Plato Durham of North Carolina and Nora Tracy Durham Dixon, daughter of Dr. and Mrs. James Wright Tracy. Dr. Durham was the stepson of a Methodist minister and the grandchild of a Methodist minister and was well trained in the workings of the church.

Candler
Durham was selected Dean of Candler in the summer of 1914, when Chancellor Warren A. Candler convinced Emory College to begin a school of theology subsequent the loss of Vanderbilt by the Methodist Episcopal Church, South. Candler School of Theology opened for classes on September 23, 1914. There were immediate criticisms of the school, chiefly that the faculty was too liberal.

During the Durham administration, the dean became an integral part of the administration of the University and in fact, Chancellor Candler considered Dean Durham his closest assistant, administering the University whenever Chancellor Candler's episcopal duties pulled him away from the campus.

In 1914, Candler was housed in Wesley Memorial church. When the Druid Hills campus was opened in the fall of 1916, Durham oversaw the move into the new building. The chapel in the Theology building was named after Dean Durham and is currently the reading room in Pitts Library. Under Dean Durham's guidance, the theological pattern at the school conformed to the prevailing patterns at the time, with the focus of study being on Biblical studies.

Durham was an "idealist, a dreamer, and a mystic." However, he was not an administrator. Led by Professor Andrew Sledd, the faculty rose up in revolt and Dean Durham retired in November 1918. He died in Atlanta on February 10, 1930.

References

1873 births
1930 deaths
People from Shelby, North Carolina
People from Atlanta

Emory University faculty
Candler School of Theology
American university and college faculty deans
American Methodist clergy